Chassillé is a commune in the Sarthe department in the Pays de la Loire region in north-western France.

Geography
The village lies on the right bank of the Vègre, which flows southwestward through the commune.

See also
Communes of the Sarthe department

References

Communes of Sarthe